Richard Cotovsky (born January 13, 1954) is an American character actor of film, stage, and television.  He is also a director of stage.

Richard Cotovsky was born in Chicago, Illinois. He attended Southern Illinois University. He transferred to the University of Illinois at the Medical Center in Chicago to earn a degree in Pharmacy. In his senior year, he took introduction to the theater which made him interested in acting.

In 1999, Cotovsky directed Brian Friel's play, "Freedom of the City," at the Mary-Arrchie Theatre Company in Chicago, Illinois.  He received a Joseph Jefferson Citation for directing this play which also received best ensemble and production. In 2000, he directed at Chicago, Illinois's Live Bait Theater's the world premiere of the John Susman play "Nelson & Simone".  In 2006, he acted in the Sam Shepard play, "Buried Child," at the Mary-Arrchie Theatre Company.

Filmography

References

External links
 

1954 births
American male film actors
American male stage actors
American male television actors
Living people
Male actors from Chicago
American directors